Diplazium hymenodes, sometimes called the peacock fern (although this name is also used for other species), is a twinsorus fern in the wood fern family of polypod ferns.  It is native to Puerto Rico, but also occurs in Jamaica and Cuba.  It prefers a moist growing environment at low to low-middle elevations.

References

hymenodes